The Hall Ibex is an experimental, American, gull winged, single seat glider that was designed by Stan Hall and first flown in 1968.

Design & Development 

The Ibex was designed by Hall to investigate the reduced wetted area of the pod and boom configuration, hands off spiral stability of a gull wing, and the low speed performance of wide NACA slotted flaps.  It also features a V tail,  of water ballast and a  wingspan to comply with FAI Standard Class rules. On one of its first flights the Ibex showed significant tail flutter.  Initially Hall considered replacing the tail with a conventional empennage and tail but ended up moving the ruddervator counterweights from the tips to the roots which eliminated the problem.

Operational history
The Ibex was still flying in 1980 and was eventually donated to the National Soaring Museum.

Aircraft on display
National Soaring Museum - 1 in storage

Specifications (Hall Ibex)

See also

References

External links
The IBEX - designed by Stan Hall

1960s United States sailplanes
Stan Hall gliders
Aircraft first flown in 1968
Gull-wing aircraft
V-tail aircraft